Santiago López de Rego y Labarta (3 March 1869 – 23 August 1941) was a Spanish clergyman and bishop for the Roman Catholic Diocese of Caroline Islands. He was born in Santiago de Compostela. He became ordained in 1903. He was appointed bishop in 1923. He died on 23 August 1941, at the age of 72.

References

Spanish Roman Catholic bishops
1869 births
1941 deaths
People from Santiago de Compostela
Roman Catholic bishops of Caroline Islands